Intensive gathering entails the tending-to of wild plants. Intensive gathering or "tending" methods include weeding, discouraging predators, pot-irrigation, and limited harvesting to ensure reproduction. The same system of methods is involved in cultivation, a process which additionally requires systematic soil preparation and planting to tending and harvesting. This human manipulation results in the domestication of involved plant life.

References

Horticulture
Foraging